The ABC Champions Cup 1998 was the 9th staging of the ABC Champions Cup, the basketball club tournament of Asian Basketball Confederation. The tournament was held in Kuala Lumpur, Malaysia, between April 25 to May 2, 1998.

Preliminary round

Group A

Group B

Classification 5th–10th

9th place

7th place

5th place

Final round

Semifinals

3rd place

Final

Final standing

Awards
Most Valuable Player:  Michael Cumberland (Al-Riyadi)
Best Scorer:  Bobby Parks (Beeper 150)
Best Playmaker:  Wayman Strickland (Regal)
Sixth Man Award:  Elie Nasr (Al-Riyadi)
Best Coach:  Li Xin (Hanwei) and  Felton Sealey (Bangkok)
Sportsmanship Award:  Teh Choon Yean (Petronas)

References
Results
FIBA Asia

1998
Champions Cup
B
Basketball Asia Champions Cup 1998